Beach Haven is an unincorporated community in Salem Township, Luzerne County, Pennsylvania, United States. Beach Haven has a post office with ZIP code 18601, which opened on February 6, 1844.

References

Unincorporated communities in Luzerne County, Pennsylvania
Unincorporated communities in Pennsylvania